Grassyfork Fisheries Farm No. 1, also known as Ozark Fisheries Shireman Farm, is a historic goldfish hatchery and national historic district located in Washington Township, Morgan County, Indiana.  The Grassyfork Office and Display Room building was built in 1936, and is a one-story, rectangular, brick building with a hipped roof. It measures 36 feet by 100 feet. The property includes a variety of buildings, structures, and sites associated with the fish hatchery.  Among them are a barn, six wells, two dams, remains of formal landscaping and rock garden, and all goldfish ponds, levees, and associated dirt roads.

It was listed on the National Register of Historic Places in 2012.

References

External links
Where We Live: Grassyfork Fisheries: a preservation tale that's no fish story, August 21, 2012
Osark Fisheries website

Goldfish
Fish hatcheries in the United States
Historic districts on the National Register of Historic Places in Indiana
Farms on the National Register of Historic Places in Indiana
Buildings and structures completed in 1936
Historic districts in Morgan County, Indiana
National Register of Historic Places in Morgan County, Indiana